Chorley, Cholmondeley is a civil parish in Cheshire East, England.  It contains four buildings that are recorded in the National Heritage List for England as designated listed buildings, all of which are at Grade II.  This grade is the lowest of the three gradings given to listed buildings and is applied to "buildings of national importance and special interest".  The parish is entirely rural, the listed buildings consisting of two farmhouses, a cottage, and a former bridewell converted into a house.

See also
Listed buildings in Cholmondeley, Cheshire
Listed buildings in Faddiley
Listed buildings in Baddiley
Listed buildings in Wrenbury cum Frith

References

Listed buildings in the Borough of Cheshire East
Lists of listed buildings in Cheshire